This is a list of notable open-source video games. Open-source video games are assembled from and are themselves open-source software, including public domain games with public domain source code. This list also includes games in which the engine is open-source but other data (such as art and music) is under a more restrictive license.

Open engine and free data
The games in this table are developed under a free and open-source license with free content which allows reuse, modification and commercial redistribution of the whole game. Licenses can be public domain, GPL, BSD, Creative Commons, zlib, MIT, Artistic License or other (see the comparison of Free and open-source software and the Comparison of free and open-source software licenses).

Open-source games with non-free data
Only the game engines in this table are developed under an open-source license, which means that the reuse and modification of only the code is permitted. As some of the games' content created by the developers (sound, graphics, video and other artwork) is proprietary or restricted in use, the whole games are non-free and restricted in reuse (depending on the content license). The motivation of developers to keep own game content non-free while they open the source code may be the protection of the game as sellable commercial product. It could also be the prevention of a commercialization of a free product in future, e.g. when distributed under a non-commercial license like CC NC. By replacing the non-free content with free content, these games could also become completely free. In practice, many projects include a mixture of free and non-free own content.

Open-source remakes with non-free data from the proprietary original 

The video game remakes in this table were developed under an open-source license which allows usually the reuse, modification and commercial redistribution of the code. The required game content (artwork, data, etc.) is taken from a proprietary and non-opened commercial game, so that the whole game is non-free. See also the Game engine recreation page.

Source-available games 
Video games in this table are source-available, but are neither open-source software according to the OSI definition nor free software according to the Free Software Foundation. These games are released under a license with limited rights for the user, for example only the rights to read and modify the game's source for personal or educational purposes but no reuse rights beside the game's original context are granted. Typical licenses are the creative commons "non-commercial" licenses (e.g. CC BY-NC-SA), MAME like licenses or several shared source licenses.

Proprietary developed games, later released under varying licenses

For games that were originally developed proprietary as commercial closed source product, see also :Category:Commercial video games with freely available source code.

See also

List of open-source game engines
List of open-source first-person shooters
List of commercial video games with available source code
List of commercial video games released as freeware
List of freeware games
Homebrew
Linux gaming

References

External links

LibreGameWiki
Open source games list

Video game lists by license